Goran Dragović (born 20 October 1981) is a Bosnian-Herzegovinian professional football player currently playing in the FK Voždovac.

Club career
Born in Sarajevo, SR Bosnia and Herzegovina, he spent most of his career playing in Serbia.  He made his professional debut with FK Radnički Beograd, however it was with FK Voždovac that he spent most time, 6 seasons.  He later played for FK Javor Ivanjica in the Serbian SuperLiga before moving to FK Metalurg Skopje in the summer of 2011 to play in the Macedonian First League.

In July 2013 he returned to FK Voždovac who had just been promoted to the Serbian SuperLiga.

References

External sources
 Goran Dragović Stats at Utakmica.rs

1981 births
Living people
Footballers from Sarajevo
Serbs of Bosnia and Herzegovina
Serbian footballers
Association football defenders
Bosnia and Herzegovina footballers
FK Radnički Beograd players
FK Voždovac players
Kazma SC players
FK Javor Ivanjica players
FK Metalurg Skopje players
FK Zvezdara players
FK Hajduk Beograd players
Second League of Serbia and Montenegro players
First League of Serbia and Montenegro players
Serbian SuperLiga players
Macedonian First Football League players
Bosnia and Herzegovina expatriate footballers
Expatriate footballers in Kuwait
Expatriate footballers in North Macedonia
Bosnia and Herzegovina expatriate sportspeople in North Macedonia
Bosnia and Herzegovina expatriate sportspeople in Kuwait
Kuwait Premier League players